Maruja Bustamante, born in 1978 in Buenos Aires, is an actress of TV, cinema, theater, playwright, and lives in Buenos Aires.

Biography
Maruja Bustamante trained as an actress with Helena Tritek and was her assistant at the first staging of Jorge Accame's Venecia in 1998. Since 2001 she premiered her first play as a director, with Esteban Meloni and Sebastián Mogordoy Fronterizos (2001) at Teatro Por la Identidad.
She graduated from the playwriting career of the Metropolitan School of Dramatic Arts in Buenos Aires. She's part of the Royal Court program to Latin American authors.

In 2008 she's part of the program Panorama Work In Progress with her play Adela is hunting ducks (original title: Adela está cazando patos) gets her the award Trinidad Guevara Best Author (2009) and Best Costume Design (2009). Also is decorated with Award of Stimulus María Guerrero Award (2009), Best Photography and the yearly Municipal Playwriting Award of the City of Buenos Aires (2009–2016). In 2010 she debuts Paraná Porá, praised by critics and the academy, a piece written in Spanish and Guarani. The piece earned her awards as the Trinidad Guevara Award, and awards in national and international theater festivals in Argentina, Costa Rica and Spain.

She wrote and directed the episodic saga The Legend of Lis Chi (2013) in the theater 25 de Mayo (Villa Urquiza) part of the Complejo Cultural San Martin, co-written with Gael Policano Rossi. Her playwright work was reunited on the book Hija Boba (Blatt & Río, 2014).

Filmography
Actress
 2016: That's Not Cheating
 2017: Mama se fue de casa

Theater

References

Living people
Argentine actresses
1978 births